Woodyhallen is an indoor arena in Katrineholm, Sweden. Its current capacity is 3,000 and it was built in 2006. It is used to host ice hockey and other indoor events.

Indoor ice hockey venues in Sweden
Ice hockey venues in Sweden